The western hoolock gibbon (Hoolock hoolock) is a primate from the gibbon family, Hylobatidae. The species is found in Assam, Mizoram, and Meghalaya in India, Bangladesh, and Myanmar west of the Chindwin River.

Classification
Mootnick and Groves stated that hoolock gibbons do not belong in the genus Bunopithecus, and placed them in a new genus, Hoolock. This genus was argued to contain two and later three distinct species, which were previously thought to be subspecies: H. hoolock, H. leuconedys, and H. tianxing.  A larger evolutionary distance was later found to exist between these three species and the white-handed gibbons than between bonobos and chimpanzees.

A new subspecies of the western hoolock gibbon has been described recently from northeastern India, which has been named the Mishmi Hills hoolock gibbon, H. h. mishmiensis.

Vocalisation 
Like other gibbons, hoolock gibbon pairs produce a loud, elaborate song, usually as a duet from the forest canopy, in which younger individuals of the family group may join. The song includes an introductory sequence, an organising sequence, and a great call sequence, with the male also contributing to the latter (unlike in some other gibbon species).

Habitat
In India and Bangladesh, it is found where the canopy is contiguous, broad-leaved, wet evergreen and mixed evergreen forests, including dipterocarp forests and often in mountainous terrain. The species is an important seed disperser; its diet includes mostly ripe fruits, with some flowers, leaves, and shoots.

Conservation
Numerous threats exist for western hoolock gibbons in the wild, and they are now entirely dependent on human action for their survival. Threats include habitat encroachment by humans, forest clearance for tea cultivation, the practice of jhuming (slash-and-burn cultivation), hunting for food and "medicine", capture for trade, and forest degradation.

Since the 1980s, western hoolock gibbon numbers are estimated to have dropped from more than 100,000 (Assam alone was estimated to have around 80,000 in the early 1970s) to less than 5,000 individuals (a decline of more than 90%). In 2009 it was considered to be one of the 25 most endangered primates,
though it has been dropped from the later editions of the list.

See also
Lawachara National Park

References

western hoolock gibbon
Primates of South Asia
Mammals of Bangladesh
Mammals of Myanmar
Mammals of India
Endangered fauna of Asia
Species endangered by the pet trade
western hoolock gibbon
Taxa named by Richard Harlan
Endangered Fauna of China